Tandur is a rural locality in the Gympie Region, Queensland, Australia. In the  Tandur had a population of 186 people.

History 
Tandur Provisional School opened on 29 September 1924. On 1 May 1929 it became Tandur State School. It closed on 16 July 1967.

In the  Tandur had a population of 186 people.

References 

Gympie Region
Localities in Queensland